Sir Reginald George Watson  was born in June 1862, in Portland Place, Bath. He was the son of General E.D. Watson of Bengal Army. Watson married Sydney Francis Vivien Presgrave. He died in 1926.

Education
Watson received his education at Haileybury College, Hertford, England and was the Straits Settlements Civil Service cadet in 1883, Private Secretary to Sir Cecil Clementi Smith, 1884- 1885; Officer of Land Office, Malacca (1887), British Resident of Perak (1913–1919).

References
World Statesmen

1862 births
1926 deaths
History of Perak
Administrators in British Malaya
Companions of the Order of St Michael and St George